5Y Capital is a Shanghai-based venture capital firm founded in 2008. It was previously known as Morningside Venture Capital before it rebranded in October 2020.

Background 
5Y Capital was founded in 2008 by Ken Shi and Richard Liu under the name, Morningside Venture Capital.

Prior to founding the firm, Liu and Shi worked as investment professionals at the Morningside Group, a family office founded in 1986 by Gerald Chan and his family. The Chan family currently runs the Hang Lung Group in Hong Kong.

As a gesture of support, Morningside Group authorized the firm to use the ‘Morningside’ brand in its operations as well as being a key investor in the firm.

In October 2020, the firm rebranded to 5Y Capital. The name comes from 'Wuyuan Road' which is the street where the firm has been headquartered since its inception.

5Y Capital focuses on early-stage venture investments in different sectors.

5Y Capital is headquartered in Shanghai with additional offices in Beijing, Shenzhen, and Hong Kong.

Funds

Notable Investments 

 Xiaomi
 Kuaishou
 Xpeng
 Sohu
 Trip.com
 YY.com
 Huya Live
 Xunlei
 WPS Office
 Sensetime
 Phoenix Television
 UCWeb
 Musical.ly
 Keep
 Xiaozhu
 Redcore
 Kunlun Fight
 ShareChat
 Pony.ai

Controversies
In 2021, 5Y Capital was alleged to have conducted illegal fundraising from the public. On the evening of January 15, the company issued a statement claiming that this was false, self-proclaiming that it had never authorized any entity or individual to conduct public fundraising activities.

On April 9, 2021, 5Y Capital reduced its stake in Xiaomi, but made an erroneous disclosure, with the disclosure document of its interest accidentally appearing in the change of interest of Kuaishou Technology.

References

External links
 Official Website

Chinese companies established in 2008
Financial services companies established in 2008
Investment management companies of China
Venture capital firms of China